Sund Rock is a designated conservation area on the U.S. state of Washington's Hood Canal. The area is known for abundant and diverse life, including but not limited to Lingcod, Giant Pacific Octopus, Wolf Eel, as well as nudibranch, anemone, and sea cucumber. 

The area is well known to regional scuba divers, especially for its two major walls, known colloquially as the north and south walls.  These walls have depths , depending upon the tide. Several other walls exist, some going down beyond  in depth. One of these is called "fish pen wall." Additional features include the "fish bowl"—a reef-like area full of life—a large sunken boat just to the north of the north wall, and a small wrecked boat between the north and south walls.

Recreational and technical divers alike find Sund Rock attractive for various reasons. Recreational divers appreciate Sund Rock because it is not a current-sensitive area, the main walls are easily within recreational dive limits, and for abundant sea life. Technical divers enjoy the deeper walls and other areas that allow them to dive well beyond recreational limits.

Because Sund Rock is a conservation area, no hunting or gathering of any kind is permitted. Two ways exist of entering the waters in the area.
An alternative method is to access a private beach nearby.

The boundaries of the area are

References

Underwater diving sites in the United States